Enver Ören (10 February 1939, Honaz, Denizli – 22 February 2013, Şişli, Istanbul) was the founder of İhlas Holding. He was born in Turkey. He graduated from the Faculty of Science at Istanbul University in 1961. He was accepted to the premier military school of Turkey with a full scholarship and graduated top of his class. After graduating he went to Italy, on a NATO scholarship for one and a half years for further study and research. In the early 1970s he assumed the heavy responsibility of publishing a newspaper.

Ören was awarded the honorary degree of Doctor of Science by Selçuk University in Konya, Turkey for his contributions to the advancement of science and technology. He was also awarded the decade's most successful manager of a newspaper company (1980–1990) by the Ankara Association of Journalists. He was the Associate President of the Newspaper Owners' Association and a Board Member of the Press Advertising Authority (Basin Yayın Kurumu). He was also an honorary member of the International Islamic Science Academy. He speaks English and French and has been frequently called upon to speak and participate in numerous international seminars, meetings and symposia.

Enver Ören had been married to Dilvin Ören since the 1968. The couple's only son, Ahmet Mücahid Ören, was chosen to follow his father's footsteps by assuming leadership positions within Ihlas Holding.

References

1939 births
2013 deaths
People from Honaz
Turkish businesspeople
Burials at Eyüp Cemetery